Skin on Skin is the second and final studio album by Canadian singer Vanity, released on May 24, 1986 by Motown Records. This out of print recording was originally released on LP (6167ML) and cassette (6167MC) through Motown Records and distributed in Europe by RCA/Ariola. The album features the R&B singles "Under the Influence" and "Animals".

Track listing

Personnel

Vanity – lead vocals
Robbie Nevil – guitar (tracks: 1, 4)
Gardner Cole – synthesizer (tracks: 3)
Paulinho Da Costa – percussion (tracks: 1, 3, 4, 5)
Alfie Silas – backing vocals (tracks: 1, 2, 4, 8, 9)
Dee Dee Bellson – backing vocals (tracks: 2, 3, 5)
Donna DeLory – backing vocals (tracks: 2, 5, 6)
Jean Johnson – backing vocals (tracks: 2, 4, 8)
Von Faggett – backing vocals (tracks: 2, 4, 6, 7) 
Carl Anderson, Joe Pizzulo, Phyllis St. James – backing vocals (tracks: 9)
Rege Burrell – backing vocals

Technical
Dave Bianco – engineer
Dennis Mackay – engineer
Keith Seppanen – engineer
Greg Fulginiti – mastering
Matthew Rolston – photography
Janet Levinson – design
"The Buck" – executive producer
Skip Drinkwater – producer
Tommy Faragher – producer

Recorded in California at Fiddlers Recording Studio, Hollywood; Preferred Sound, West Hollywood; Baby 'O Recorders, Hollywood; Summa Studio, West Hollywood; Soundcastle Recording Studios, Los Angeles; & Yamaha Research & Development Studio, Glendale.Mixed at Yamaha Research & Development Studio except "Under The Influence" mixed at Soundcastle Recording Studios.
Mastered at Artisan Sound, Hollywood, California

Charts

Weekly charts

Billboard R&B Albums (spent 19 weeks on the chart).

Singles

References

Vanity (singer) albums
1986 albums
Motown albums